Caseodus is an extinct genus of eugeneodontid holocephalian from the Carboniferous of the United States (Illinois, Indiana, Kansas, South Dakota) and the Early Triassic of Canada (British Columbia).

Eugeneodontida are an extinct order of Chondrichthyes. They are characterized by the presence of tooth whorls. They include iconic genera, such as Helicoprion ("buzz-saw shark"), Ornithoprion, Edestus  or Fadenia. Caseodus is one of the few eugeneodontid genera that survived the end-Permian mass extinction event. It is one of the last surviving genera of this clade. 

Caseodus is named after the late paleoichthyologist Gerard Case.

References

 

Caseodontidae
Prehistoric cartilaginous fish genera
Carboniferous cartilaginous fish
Triassic cartilaginous fish
Fossils of Canada